The Day They Shot a Hole in the Jesus Egg (subtitled The Priest Driven Ambulance Album, Demos, and Outtakes, 1989-1991) is a 2xCD compilation of material by The Flaming Lips released by Restless Records in late 2002. It is the second of two reissues compiling the band's work with the record label, and follows Finally the Punk Rockers Are Taking Acid.

The first disc contains the album In a Priest Driven Ambulance, followed by related B-sides from that era. The second disc contains a much-bootlegged series of demos called The Mushroom Tapes, featuring early versions and alternate mixes of Ambulance tracks.

The first disc of this set was released on vinyl as a limited-edition, pink-colored two-record set under the title of In a Priest Driven Ambulance.

The compilation is named after a line from the Flaming Lips song "Five Stop Mother Superior Rain".  It also includes new liner notes from band frontman Wayne Coyne.

Track listing

Disc one

Disc two

References

The Flaming Lips compilation albums
2002 compilation albums
Restless Records compilation albums